Vladimir Vasilyevich Nikitin (born 14 July 1959) is a former Soviet cross-country skier who competed in the 1980s, training at Zenit. He won a silver in the 4 × 10 km relay at the 1984 Winter Olympics in Sarajevo.

Nikitin also won a gold medal in the 4 × 10 km relay at the 1982 FIS Nordic World Ski Championships (tied with Norway).

His best individual finish was fourth in the 1983 World Cup event in Canada.

Cross-country skiing results
All results are sourced from the International Ski Federation (FIS).

Olympic Games
1 medal – (1 silver)

World Championships
1 medal – (1 gold)

World Cup

Team podiums
1 victory
2 podiums

Note:  Until the 1999 World Championships and the 1994 Winter Olympics, World Championship and Olympic races were included in the World Cup scoring system.

References

External links

1959 births
Living people
Soviet male cross-country skiers
Olympic cross-country skiers of the Soviet Union
Olympic silver medalists for the Soviet Union
Olympic medalists in cross-country skiing
Cross-country skiers at the 1984 Winter Olympics
Medalists at the 1984 Winter Olympics
FIS Nordic World Ski Championships medalists in cross-country skiing
Universiade medalists in cross-country skiing
Universiade gold medalists for the Soviet Union
Competitors at the 1985 Winter Universiade
Competitors at the 1987 Winter Universiade